The Valiants Memorial is a military monument located in Ottawa, Ontario, Canada. It commemorates fourteen key figures from the military history of Canada. Dedicated by Governor General Michaëlle Jean on 5 November 2006, the work consists of nine busts and five statues, all life-sized, by artists Marlene Hilton Moore and John McEwen.

The monument was installed around the Sappers Staircase, an underpass on the northeastern corner of Confederation Square, adjacent to the National War Memorial. The wall of the staircase is decorated with a quotation from the Aeneid by Virgil:
 "Nulla dies umquam memori vos eximet aevo"
which translates to "No day will ever erase you from the memory of time" (French: Aucun jour ne t'effacera jamais de la mémoire du temps).

The heroes commemorated in the monument are:

From the French Regime (1534–1763):

From the American Revolution (1775–1783):

From the War of 1812 (1812–1815):

From the First World War (1914–1918):

From the Second World War (1938–1945):

References

External links

Monuments and memorials in Ottawa
Military history of Canada
Canadian military memorials and cemeteries
2006 sculptures
2006 establishments in Ontario